Wall Street Raider, stylized as Wall $treet Raider, is a 1989 video game published by Intracorp.

Gameplay
Wall $treet Raider is a game in which players use the stock market to take over companies. Up to four players could play, and divided a billion dollars between them.

Packaging
Intracorp included a coupon for a free rental of the film Wall Street with every purchase of the game.

Reception
John Harrington reviewed Wall $treet Raider and Wall Street Wizard for Games International magazine, and gave it a rating of 6 out of 10, and stated that "Raider is a little dry as a solo game; you start the game with a considerable fortune and the temptation is to say '$250 000 is enough for any man, I'll emigrate to the Bahamas'.."

Daniel Carr for Computer Play called it "a BIG game" and "corporate warfare at its best".

References

1989 video games
IntraCorp games